Yimen County is a county in the central part of Yunnan Province, China. It is under the administration of the prefecture-level city of Yuxi.

Administrative divisions
Yimen County has 2 subdistricts, 1 town, 2 townships and 3 ethnic townships. 
2 subdistricts
 Longquan
 Liujie
1 town
 Shizi
2 townships
 Luzhi
 Xiaojie
3 ethnic townships
 Pubei Yi
 Shijie Yi
 Tongchang Yi

Climate

References

External links
Yimen County Official Website

 
County-level divisions of Yuxi